James M. Bingham (February 3, 1828January 8, 1885) was an American lawyer and Republican politician.  He served as the 13th lieutenant governor of Wisconsin, the 20th speaker of the Wisconsin State Assembly, and the 13th mayor of Chippewa Falls, Wisconsin.

Biography
He was born in Perry, New York, in 1828, and moved to Palmyra, Wisconsin, in 1854, where he practiced law. Bingham served in the 40th Wisconsin Infantry Regiment as a major. A Republican, he served terms in the Wisconsin State Assembly in 1863, 1864, 1869, 1870, and 1874 and was elected its speaker in 1870. He moved to Chippewa Falls, Wisconsin in 1870. In 1878 he was elected the 13th Lieutenant Governor of Wisconsin under Governor William E. Smith, an office he held for two terms until 1882. He died in 1885 in Chippewa Falls, Wisconsin.

Legacy
His former home, now known as the Cook-Rutledge House, is listed on the National Register of Historic Places.

Notes

References 

1828 births
1885 deaths
People from Perry, New York
People from Chippewa Falls, Wisconsin
People from Palmyra, Wisconsin
People of Wisconsin in the American Civil War
Union Army officers
Wisconsin lawyers
Speakers of the Wisconsin State Assembly
Republican Party members of the Wisconsin State Assembly
Lieutenant Governors of Wisconsin
19th-century American politicians
19th-century American lawyers